Police radio is a radio system used by police and other law enforcement agencies to communicate with one another. Police radio systems almost always use two-way radio systems to allow for communications between police officers and dispatchers.

Most modern police radio systems are encrypted, and many jurisdictions have made listening to police radio frequencies as a private citizen illegal.

History 

Before police radio systems were first implemented, police officers assigned to their beat could only communicate with police command using telephone booths, call boxes, police boxes, or physical meetings. Calling for help or signaling other officers could only be done by shouting, using a whistle, or hitting things to make sounds. This meant that properly calling for assistance, reporting an incident or arrest, being dispatched to handle a crime, or requesting police resources was only possible if the officer reached a telephone or call box.

The first police radio systems were implemented in Detroit in 1928, when the Detroit Police Department set up a one-way radio system to broadcast crime information to police cars. The frequency was assigned the call sign "KOP" by the Federal Communications Commission. To follow FCC regulations, KOP was described as an "entertainment station"; to fulfill this, KOP was made publicly accessible, and music was broadcast between descriptions of stolen vehicles and crime reports. The first two-way police radio system was implemented by the Bayonne, New Jersey police in 1933. The FCC briefly prohibited police radio communications in 1934, but rescinded their decision in 1935.

Due to their cost and size, early police radio systems were only used in police cars and buildings; officers on foot patrol still had to rely on telephones and call boxes. Portable radios introduced in the 1960s made radio communications widely accessible to all officers. Early portable radios were heavy and had short battery life, an issue that gradually disappeared as technology advanced.

Modern police radio systems are often augmented by mobile data terminals to effectively manage units and assignments.

Police radio systems historically used public radio frequencies, and listening to them was, for the most part, legal. Most modern police radio systems switched to encrypted radio systems in the 1990s and 2000s to prevent eavesdroppers from listening in.

By country

Canada 
In Canada, the Radiocommunication Act states that it is illegal to intercept private radio communications with the intent to divulge or use any information obtained in the interception. This applies to any attempts to listen to emergency services radios and police radios. Additionally, there are prohibitions on certain radio scanner devices.

Germany

In Germany, it is illegal for private citizens to listen to police radio, even if it is unintentional. Offenders can be punished with up to two years in prison or a fine.

Japan 
In Japan, police radio communication regulation is managed by the National Police Agency. Prefectural police manage their own radio communications, which are officially limited to their respective jurisdictions but are capable of being used nationwide if necessary. Individual officers communicate with radio operators in nearby police stations, while police vehicles communicate with their prefectural police's communications command centers, located at prefectural police headquarters.

In Japan, police radio frequencies are encrypted and are illegal for civilians to access.

Norway

In Norway, it was historically legal for private citizens to listen to police radio frequencies. However, this is no longer possible, as the Norwegian Police Service switched to "Nødnett", an encrypted radio system.

United Kingdom
In the United Kingdom, police radios were pioneered largely by Captain Athelstan Popkess of the Nottingham City Police in the early 1930s, with trials commencing in 1931, and the results published in a 1933–1934 series of articles. These experiments concluded that wireless telegraphy was preferable to wireless telephony, due to better signal reception, less chances of interception, and messages being just as quick to send and receive by Morse-proficient officers.

Popkess paired this use of police radios with his simultaneous development of increased use of police cars for patrol purposes stating that “There can be no real mobility unless [mechanization and communication] are closely related, and each is as efficient as we can make it”.

It is an offence under the Wireless Telegraphy Act 2006 to listen to police radio in the UK. The move from open analogue to the encrypted digital airwave system (TETRA) in the UK has made it practically impossible for civilians to listen to police radio.

United States
In the United States, police departments, sheriff's departments, and state police often run their own systems in parallel, presenting interoperability problems. The Federal Communications Commission assigns licenses to these entities in the public safety (PP and PX) allotments of the spectrum. These include allocations in the lower portion of the VHF spectrum (around 39–45 MHz), highly susceptible to "skip" interference but still used by state highway patrols; the VHF "hi-band", from 150–160 MHz; and various UHF bands. Many systems still use conventional FM transmissions for most traffic; others are trunked analog or digital systems. Recently, there has been a move towards digital trunked systems, especially those based around the public-safety standard Project 25 format set by the Association of Public-Safety Communications Officials-International. A minority of other police radio systems, the largest examples being the Milwaukee Police Department and Pennsylvania State Police, use the incompatible OpenSky format. TETRA, the standard in many European countries as well as other places in the world, is virtually unused in the United States.

Some states operate statewide radio networks with varying levels of participation from police on the county and city levels:

 Illinois: StarCom21
 Louisiana: Louisiana Wireless Information Network (LWIN)
 Michigan: Michigan Public Safety Communications System (MPSCS)
 Minnesota: ARMER
 Montana: Montana Statewide Interoperable Public Safety Radio System
 North Carolina: VIPER
 Ohio: Multi-agency communications system (MARCS)
 South Carolina: Palmetto 800
 Wisconsin: WISCOM

It is generally legal in the United States to listen to unencrypted police communications, though some states and municipalities prohibit carrying receivers within vehicles.

See also 
 Dispatcher
 Radio scanner
 Police code

References

Law enforcement
Types of radios